Bootlegged, Broke and in Solvent Seas is a live album by Canadian electro-industrial band Skinny Puppy. It was recorded in Warsaw, Bratislava, Hildesheim, and Budapest during the band's 2010 European tour and saw release on June 12, 2012 through Metropolis Records in the US and on June 15, 2012 through Dependent Records in Germany.

Track listing

Personnel
Skinny Puppy
 Nivek Ogre - vocals
 cEvin Key - keyboards, programming
 Justin Bennett - drums

Additional personnel
 Steven R. Gilmore – art direction, artwork, design
 Jeff Jacquin  – management
 Ashley McMillan – backstage management
 Kerrie Kordowski-Jensen – costumes
 Ken Marshall - live sound
 Sarah Hill – projections, environment
 Tim Hill – projections, environment
 Sash Coon – prop master
 Time Gore – prosthetic designs

Chart positions

References

2012 albums
Skinny Puppy albums
Metropolis Records live albums